Ipek Duben (born 1941) is a contemporary visual artist based in Istanbul. She produces artist books, poetry, installations, video, painting and sculpture. Her work deals with identity issues, feminism, and migration with a strong emphasis on social and political criticism. Besides actively producing and exhibiting art,Duben also has numerous published essays and books on art and criticism.Her work has been shown in international institutions including ), Staatliche Kunsthalle Baden-Baden (2022), Kunstraum Keuzberg/Bethanien (2022), Social Works,Frieze London (2018), Brighton Festival (2017), Fabrica, Brighton UK (2017), SALT Galata, Istanbul (2015), British Museum, London (2014), 13th Istanbul Biennial (2013), Istanbul Modern (2011, 2009), The National Museum of Women in the Arts, Washington D.C., (2010) and Akademie der Künst, Berlin (2009). In 2015, SALT published a  collection of her essays on art and criticism written between 1978 and 2010.

Education 
Ipek Duben earned her BA at Agnes Scott College (1963), MA (1965) and ABD (1969, all but the dissertation) in Political science at the University of Chicago. She later had formal training in studio practice at the New York Studio School which she completed in 1976. Having relocated to Istanbul, Turkey, she continued her studies with a PhD in Art History, titled "Turkish Painting and Criticism: 1880–1945", which she completed in1984 at Mimar Sinan University. In 1991 she moved back to New York where she lived for another 10 years before moving back to Istanbul in 2001.

Exhibitions 
Ipek Duben has participated at the 13th Istanbul Biennial (2013); 3rd European International Book Art Biennale, Moscow (2014); Fourth and Fifth International Artist’s Book Exhibition, The King St. Stephen Museum, Hungary (2013, 2006); Center for Book Arts, New York (2009); First and Fifth Bibliotheca Alexandrina International Biennale for the Artist's Book, Alexandria, Egypt (2010, 2004);  International Short Film Festival, Oberhausen, Germany (2008); River’s Edge Film Festival, Kentucky (2006), New Media Art Festival, Hammer Museum, Los Angeles (2006), Museum of Contemporary Art, Copenhagen ( video, 2006); and 5th Sharjah Biennial (2001).

Her work was shown at institutions such as the Belvedere Museum, Vienna (2016), British Museum, London (2014), Istanbul Modern, Istanbul, (2011, 2009 & 2007), National Museum of Women in the Arts, Washington (2010), Academy of Arts, Berlin (2009), and ZKM Center for Art and Media Karlsruhe, Germany.

Monographic exhibitions include “The Skin, Body and I, İpek Duben Retrospective, at SALT Beyoğlu, Istanbul (2022); "Onlar/They" at SALT Galata, Istanbul (2015) and Fabrica Contemporary Arts Center, Brighton (2017), and "Ipek Duben: A selection 1994–2009", Akbank Sanat, Istanbul (2009).

Collections 
Ipek Duben's works are held in the collections of: Istanbul Modern, The British Museum,Arter, Istanbul; Bibliotheca Alexandrina-Egypt; Museum voor Volkenkunde, Rotterdam; Wien Museum (as part of Karamustafa Export Import Project); King St. Stephen Museum, Deak Collection, Székesfehérar, Hungary; Center for Book Arts-New York; Moscow Artist's Book Archive; Zorlu Foundation, Istanbul; SALT e-publications  İpek Duben Yazı ve Söyleşileri 1978-2010 [İpek Duben Essays and Interviews 1978-2010],

http://saltonline.org/tr/1432; İpek Duben [ONLAR/THEY, Video Installation], 

http://saltonline.org/tr/1432, 2016

References 

1941 births
Living people
20th-century Turkish women artists
21st-century Turkish women artists
University of Chicago alumni
New York Studio School of Drawing, Painting and Sculpture alumni
Agnes Scott College alumni